The College Grove Methodist Church is a building in College Grove, Tennessee that was listed on the National Register of Historic Places in 1988.  It was built c.1888 and was designed and/or built by T.G. Slate.

The church is one of the "best examples", along with the Trinity United Methodist Church on Wilson Pike, of more elaborate historic churches built in Williamson County.

It includes Stick/Eastlake architecture.

References

Churches on the National Register of Historic Places in Tennessee
Churches in Williamson County, Tennessee
Victorian architecture in Tennessee
Churches completed in 1889
19th-century Methodist church buildings in the United States
Stick-Eastlake architecture in the United States
National Register of Historic Places in Williamson County, Tennessee